Ye Min Thu (born 18 February 1998) is a footballer from Burma who plays as a defender for Myanmar U23 and plays club football with Shan United.

Honours

Club
Shan United 
Myanmar National League
Winners (2): 2017, 2019
Runners-up (1): 2018
General Aung San Shield
Champions (1): 2017
Runners-up (1): 2019

International

References

1997 births
Living people
Sportspeople from Yangon
Burmese footballers
Myanmar international footballers
Shan United F.C. players
Association football defenders
Footballers at the 2018 Asian Games
Asian Games competitors for Myanmar
Competitors at the 2019 Southeast Asian Games
Southeast Asian Games medalists in football
Southeast Asian Games bronze medalists for Myanmar